Aspartyl-tRNA synthetase, cytoplasmic is an enzyme that in humans is encoded by the DARS gene.

Aspartyl-tRNA synthetase (DARS) is part of a multienzyme complex of aminoacyl-tRNA synthetases.  Aspartyl-tRNA synthetase charges its cognate tRNA with aspartate during protein biosynthesis.

Clinical significance 

Mutations in DARS have been identified as the cause of leukoencephalopathy, hypomyelination with brain stem and spinal cord involvement and leg spasticity (HBSL).

See also
Aspartate-tRNA ligase

References

Further reading